A constitutional referendum was held in Burundi on 9 March 1992. It followed the 1991 referendum on the Charter of National Unity, which gave the government a mandate to draw up a new constitution. The resulting document created a presidential republic with unlimited five-year term for candidates, introduced proportional representation as the method for electing the Parliament, guaranteed freedom of the press and human rights, and the requirement for registered political parties to accept the Charter of National Unity.

Approved by 90% of voters with a 97% turnout, the new constitution was promulgated on 13 March. The first elections held under the new constitution took place the following year, with presidential elections on 1 June and parliamentary elections on 29 June.

Results

References

1992
1992 referendums
1992 in Burundi
Constitutional referendums